Xylotrechus robustus is a species of beetle in the family Cerambycidae. It was described by Hopping in 1941.

References

Xylotrechus
Beetles described in 1941